Cacia coomani is a species of beetle in the family Cerambycidae. It was described by Stephan von Breuning in 1958. It is known from Vietnam.

References

Cacia (beetle)
Beetles described in 1958